Melanoxanthus anticus is a species of click beetle belonging to the family Elateridae.

This species seems to have wide distribution in Maharashtra (India).

References
Synopsis of the described coleoptera of the world

Beetles described in 1892
Endemic fauna of India